is a Japanese classical violinist.

At the age of 18, she became the youngest winner of the International Tchaikovsky Competition in 1990. In addition, she was awarded second prize in the Paganini Competition in 1988 and Queen Elisabeth Competition in 1989 and is a laureate of the Music Competition of Japan.

She has studied with Toshiya Eto at the Toho Gakuen School of Music, with Dorothy DeLay and Cho-Liang Lin at the Juilliard School of Music while at Columbia University, and with Uwe-Martin Haiberg at the Universität der Künste Berlin.

Until 2019 she played the 1714 Dolphin Stradivarius, on loan from the Nippon Music Foundation. After it was returned she received the  "Charles Reade" Guarneri del Gesù on loan from Japanese collector Ryuji Ueno.

Discography
Bruch: Concerto No. 1 / Scottish Fantasy
Akiko Suwanai, violin
Sir Neville Marriner, Academy of St. Martin in the Fields
November 11, 1997: Philips Classics Records
Akiko Suwanai: Souvenir
Akiko Suwanai, violin; Phillip Moll, piano
June 8, 1998: Philips Classics Records
Dvořák: Violin Concerto, etc.
Akiko Suwanai, violin
Iván Fischer, Budapest Festival Orchestra
October 9, 2001: Decca Music Group
Mendelssohn: Violin Concerto in E Minor / Tchaikovsky: Violin Concerto in D Major
Akiko Suwanai, violin
Vladimir Ashkenazy, Czech Philharmonic Orchestra
December 20, 2001: Decca Music Group
Brahms, Dvořák, Janáček
Akiko Suwanai, violin
May 8, 2002: Philips Classics Records
Sibelius & Walton Violin Concertos
Akiko Suwanai, violin
Sakari Oramo, City of Birmingham Symphony Orchestra
2003: Decca Music Group
Poème
Akiko Suwanai, violin
Charles Dutoit, Philharmonia Orchestra of London
November 9, 2004: Decca Music Group
Bach: Violin Concertos
Akiko Suwanai, violin
Chamber Orchestra of Europe
May 2, 2006: Decca Music Group

References
Decca Music Group's Biography for Akiko Suwanai

Akiko Suwanai Official website

External links
Akiko Suwanai Official website 
Akiko Suwanai (HarrisonParrott) 
SUWANAI Akiko (KAJIMOTO) 

Japanese classical violinists
1972 births
Living people
Juilliard School alumni
Columbia University alumni
Toho Gakuen School of Music alumni
Prize-winners of the International Tchaikovsky Competition
Prize-winners of the Queen Elisabeth Competition
Women classical violinists
21st-century women musicians
21st-century classical violinists